24 Hours in the Past is a BBC One living history TV series first broadcast in 2015. Six celebrities were immersed in a recreation of impoverished life in Victorian Britain. Each of the four episodes represented 24 hours living and working in four different occupations.

A key part of the series was its immersive nature. The four episodes were ostensibly filmed in direct sequence, and the participants lived, ate and slept in the often filthy conditions portrayed.

Living history has become a popular theme in recent UK TV series, usually involving Ruth Goodman and regular collaborators in a long-term series, filmed in intermittent episodes with a cast of historians. This series took a different pitch, using a continuous filming technique without the respite of hotels between episodes and cast with "the randomest collection of participants" to create an air of surprise at their conditions.

Cast

Presenters 
 Fi Glover
 Ruth Goodman, well-known consultant historian and TV presenter for many living history series.

Participants 
 Alistair McGowan, impressionist
 Ann Widdecombe, former Conservative MP and cabinet minister
 Colin Jackson, world champion hurdler 
 Miquita Oliver, TV presenter
 Tyger Drew-Honey, actor in Outnumbered
 Zöe Lucker, actress

Episodes

Reception 
Critical reception was muted. The most scathing description as "frustrating and pointless watching" came from The Guardian''.

Casting of the participants worked well as five of the six were a balanced ensemble. They cooperated as a team and supported each other through adversity. Nor were any of them well-known enough to the audience to engender preconceptions of their personalities or attitudes. The obvious exception was Ann Widdecombe, the best-known of them and notable as a cabinet minister in the Back to Basics government of John Major. The audience revelled in her becoming a labour organiser protesting against their oppressive employers. Although such casting could not have been made in ignorance, Widdecombe herself denied that any part was scripted and confirmed that all of the grim accommodation was genuine.

Viewing figures were unimpressive. Although it did well against other programming in that slot, its series average of 3.3m (16%) was below the BBC1's slot average of 4.9m for the previous year. Viewing figures for the series dropped from 3.8m for the first episode to 3.2m.

Notes

References

External links 
 

Historical reality television series
2015 British television series debuts
2015 British television series endings
2010s British reality television series
English-language television shows
Television shows set in the United Kingdom
Reenactment of the late modern period
BBC television documentaries about history during the 18th and 19th centuries